The TCW Hardcore Championship was the secondary professional wrestling singles title of Turnbuckle Championship Wrestling. It was first won by Lodi after defeating "Raging Bull" Manny Fernandez in Carrollton, Georgia on September 18, 2001. The Hardcore title, like the Heavyweight title, was mostly defended in Georgia but also in other parts of the Southern United States such as Dothan, Alabama.

Title history

References

Hardcore wrestling championships